Volkovo is a rural locality (a village) in Tukayevsky Selsoviet, Aurgazinsky District, Bashkortostan, Russia. The population was 11 as of 2010. There is 1 street.

Geography 
Volkovo is located 40 km northwest of Tolbazy (the district's administrative centre) by road. Tyubyakovo is the nearest rural locality.

References 

Rural localities in Aurgazinsky District